The Lost Spy: An American in Stalin's Secret Service is a 2008 book by Andrew Meier, published by W. W. Norton & Company.  It recounts the story of Isaiah Oggins, a 1920s New York intellectual murdered in 1947 on Stalin's orders.

Reviews
 WhittakerChambers.org (2008-07-04)
 Boston Globe (2008-08-10)  
 New York Times (2008-08-22)  
 Richmond Times-Dispatch (2008-08-24)  
 Washington Post (2008-08-24)  
 Los Angeles Times (2008-08-25)
 Норильлаг - Ресурсы Интернет

External links
The Official Site for The Lost Spy: An American in Stalin's Secret Service
The Lost Spy: An American in Stalin's Secret Service, Meier, Andrew. New York:  W. W. Norton, (August 11, 2008).  plus Author Lecture at the Pritzker Military Library on March 17, 2009

2008 non-fiction books
Non-fiction books about espionage